HTC One is a series of Android and Windows Phone smartphones designed and manufactured by HTC. All products in the One series were designed to be touchscreen-based and slate-sized, and to initially run the Android mobile operating system (Android 4.0 Ice Cream Sandwich or subsequent Android releases) with the HTC Sense graphical user interface. The one exception to this is the HTC One (M8), which also had a Windows Phone variant. From 2010 to 2013, all HTC products starting from the HTC Sensation XE to the HTC One Mini were equipped with a Beats Audio equalizer. Later HTC devices beginning with the HTC One Max no longer ship with Beats Audio following the buyback of HTC's stake in Beats Electronics.

Phones

2012 lineup 
While critically acclaimed, the 2012 One series had not received much consumer attention and sales were disappointing. For one, HTC has been outspent on marketing by Samsung and Apple, as HTC instead had relied heavily on carriers to promote its products. Also, while HTC made many carrier-specific devices, Samsung and Apple were able to concentrate their resources on single flagship handsets such as the Samsung Galaxy S III and iPhone 4S to attract the attention of the consumers. Lastly, while HTC handsets were seen as better quality than Samsung's plastic devices, Samsung was able to successfully distinguish itself from other Android manufacturers with manufacturer-specific software tweaks (as well as marketing to promote its brand) while HTC could not.

The "One" devices released in 2012 consist of the following, with devices in similar price segments usually sold by different carriers:

 HTC One V, a low-end smartphone
 HTC One S, a mid-range smartphone
 The Japanese variant, HTC J, many of the same specifications as the One S, but has a larger battery and runs on WiMAX
 HTC One X, a high-end smartphone
 An LTE variant of the HTC One X with the same name is sold in North America, with a 1.5 GHz dual-core Qualcomm Snapdragon S4 MSM8960 processor instead of the quad core Nvidia Tegra
 HTC One X+ a refresh of the One X which has a faster clocked Tegra 3 processor, larger battery and more memory than the HTC One X
 HTC Evo 4G LTE, a North American variant similar to the LTE One X, but with added features including a MicroSD slot and kickstand, exclusive to Sprint Nextel

2013 lineup 

The 2013 One series was reduced to focus on only three versions of one main design. Three devices had been announced as of October 2013: the HTC One (M7) in February 2013, the One Mini in July 2013, and the One Max in October 2013. Following the previous year's setbacks, the HTC One was critically acclaimed for its design, and was commercially successful.

 HTC One (M7), the HTC One X'''s successor. It won the "Best New Mobile Handset, Device or Tablet" at Mobile World Congress 2013
 HTC One Mini, the smaller variant of the HTC One with a 4.3" screen
 HTC One Max, the larger variant of the HTC One with a 5.9" screen and a fingerprint scanner
 HTC Butterfly S, successor to the original Butterfly with a 3200 mAh battery

 2014 lineup 

 HTC One (M8), the successor to the 2013 HTC One (M7). There are two versions of this device: one running Android 4.4.2 KitKat and another running Windows Phone 8.1.
 HTC One Mini 2, the HTC One Mini's successor
 HTC One (E8), a lower-cost variant of the One (M8) with similar specs but a polycarbonate body and a single 13-megapixel camera 
 HTC Butterfly 2, is a variant of the One (M8) with similar specs encased in a polycarbonate body. It is water resistant, and has a dual rear camera (13-megapixel main camera and 2-megapixel secondary camera)

 2015 lineup 
 HTC One M9, the 2014 HTC One (M8)'s successor.
 HTC One M9+, an upscaled version of the HTC One M9
 HTC One M9+ Supreme Camera Edition, a phone similar to the HTC One M9+ but with a better camera
 HTC One ME
 HTC One E9
 HTC One E9+
 HTC One M8s, a mid-range smartphone that is similar to the HTC One M8
 HTC One M9s, a variant of the HTC One M9 with a weaker processor, less internal storage, less RAM, and a weaker rear camera.
 HTC One A9, launched on October 20. The One A9 is the first non-Nexus device launched with Android 6.0 Marshmallow.

 2016 lineup 
 HTC One A9s, the successor to the One A9 from 2015, was unveiled on 1 September 2016.
 HTC 10

 Succession 
The last flagship phone in the HTC One series was the HTC One M9, which was announced and released in 2015. Its successor, the HTC 10, is HTC's 2016 flagship phone; however, it did not use the "One" branding in the name. Its successor, the 2017 HTC U11, did not use the "One" branding either.

 Comparison 

This table is primarily intended to show the differences'' between the models of the One series:

See also 
 HTC U series

References 

 HTC ONE SERIES ROMS

One
Android (operating system) devices
Windows Phone devices
Mobile phones introduced in 2012